The 1902 Drexel Dragons football team did not have a head coach.

Schedule

References

Drexel
Drexel Dragons football seasons
Drexel Football